Francisco Ulloa is a famous merengue accordionist, specializing in merengue típico. He is known for his skill and improvisation technique on the accordion, and started his career around the same time as Tatico Henriquez, which some consider to be the godfather of merengue tipico, in the 1970s. He currently resides in Santiago, Dominican Republic. He plays at private festivals, concert halls at home, and also those abroad. His sound would be considered more similar to Fefita la Grande or Agapito Pascual rather than El Prodigio or Grupo Aguakate.

Discography 

 El Baby Vol. 1 (1970)

 Pa' Tumbar la Mala Maña
 Tú Eres la Que Sabe
 La Media Vuelta
 Milagrito
 La Nochebuena
 Si una Mujer Se Me Va
 La Mala Maña en Bachata
 Roximary
 El Tabaco
 Agua de Cubo

 La Chiflera (1979)

 Todo Para Ti
 No Voy a Llorar
 Y Yo Esperando
 La Chiflera
 Los Saxofones
 Abusadora
 Vuelve Corazón
 Ayúdame
 El Forastero
 Me Llaman Chú

 Ahora Vengo Más Fuerte (1979)

 Ahora Vengo Más Fuerte
 Poza del Castillo
 Volvamos a Querernos
 Dulce Amor
 Mi Prenda Adorada
 El Tanque de Guerra
 Río Rebelde
 Dentro de Mi Alma
 Amor Bonito
 Fiesta de Acordeón

 Divina Qué Linda Eres (1979)

 El Hombre Tuyo Soy Yo
 El Tornillo
 India de los Ojos Verdes
 Consagración del Cariño
 Cuando Te Enamoro a Ti
 Divina Qué Linda Eres
 Piedras en Mi Camino
 La Carta
 Cuando Me Acuerdo de Ti
 Mi Suegra

 El Machazo del Merengue (1979)

 El Hombre Tuyo Soy Yo
 El Tornillo
 India de los Ojos Verdes
 Consagración de Cariño
 Cuando Te Enamoro a Ti
 Divina Que Linda Eres
 Piedras En Mi Camino
 La Carta
 Cuando Me Acuerdo de Ti
 Mi Suegra

 La Tijera (1980)

 La Tijera
 Así Como Tú
 San Francisco
 Celos Sin Motivos
 La Última Moda
 Mañana Me Voy de Aquí
 María Dolores
 Homenaje a Bolo
 Ramonita
 El Pajarito
 
 Eladio Romero Santos Presenta a Francisco Ulloa y el Conjunto San Rafael (1981)

 La Cosquillita
 Que Cosita
 Dentro de Mi Corazón
 Amor Bonito
 Me Quiero Casar
 Río Rebelde
 El Tanque de Guerra
 El Alicate
 Ay Mamá
 Francisco No Llora

 Francisco Ulloa y el Conjunto San Rafael (1981)

 Bajo un Palmar
 Burrito Sabanero
 Hatillo Palma
 Hasta el Río Fuimos Juntos
 Quien Me la Entretiene
 Sufriendo Así
 No Me Dejes Solo
 La Vida
 Candelo
 Te Busco Vida Mía
 Homenaje a Monción

 Homenaje al Gran Tatico Henríquez (1983)

 La Mecedora
 Nonito en la Loma
 Mi Prenda Querida
 Acordándome de Ti
 Recuerdo a Tatico
 María la del Padre
 Detrás de la Maya
 La Cartera Vacía
 Siempre Te Recuerdo
 La Rubia

 ¡Merengue! (1987)

 La Tijera
 Agua de Tu Fuente
 La Situación
 El Beso Robado
 Tongonéate
 Ramonita
 Mañana por la Mañana
 Los Caballos
 Linda Mujer
 Lucas y Radhamés
 La Lengua
 San Francisco
 Homenaje a Bolo

 ¿Qué? ¡Aha! La Mujer de Antonio (1988)

 La Mamila
 ¿Qué? ¡Aha! La Mujer de Antonio
 Bambara Qui, Qui
 La Paloma
 La Tranca
 El Pegao
 El Puente Seco
 Chupa Que Chupa
 El Lío
 Bolívar Peralta

 ...Y los Mosquitos Pullan (1989)

 El Muchachito
 El Alicate
 Cumandé
 Recuerdo a Mi Padre
 La Porfía
 Río Soquí
 La Falda y el Rajaito
 Los Mosquitos Pullan
 Yo la Paso Bien
 El Lamento
 
 En New York (1990)

 La Muerte de Tite
 Con la Misma Piedra
 Violencia
 Tatico Llorando
 Mosaico Típico
 La Carta
 Aridio Espinal
 Las Dos Mujeres
 Recordándome de Ti
 El Telefonema

 El Chucuchá (1990)

 El Chucuchá
 Vámonos Pa' Nagua
 Nada Más Pensando en Ti
 La Pava
 La Cieguita Mía
 La Cruz de Oro
 Millonario de Amor
 El Gallo Peleao
 Chichí Mamá
 La Encontré Llorando
 La Plata

 Vol. 2 (1991)

 Y Qué Será
 Para Toda la Vida
 La Distancia Entre los Dos
 Corazón Bendito
 Mujer Ingrata
 Me la Voy a Llevar
 El Picotiao
 Mi Pensamiento
 Mi Acordeón
 Mi Morena

 ¡Ultramerengue! (1992)

 Arturo Pa'l Monte
 Dominga Qué Linda Eres
 Majando
 La Carta
 Hoy Que He Vuelto a Recordar
 Homenaje a Dany Cabrera
 La Negra Tomasa
 Si Tu Padre Te Abochorna
 Ay Mami
 Juanita Morel
 La Tinajita
 Canto de Hacha
 Pensando en Ti
 Homenaje a Santiago

 Voy Pa' Lla (1992)

 Voy Pa' Lla
 Confundido
 Cocoricamo
 La Negra
 Me Muero Por Ti
 Vida Mía
 La Cieguita Mía
 El Naranjal
 La Caravana
 Recordando a Dany

 Pa' Mi Campo (1993)
 Pegaito (1995)

 Llegó Tu Marido
 No Me Dejes Solo
 Oeo
 Joaquín García
 Jovinita
 El Pegaito
 La Mala Maña
 El Santo Cachón
 El Diente de Oro
 El Moño Parao
 Te Busco Vida Mía
 A la Orilla del Río
 Tú Me Pides Que Te Olvide
 Enamorado

 Mejor Que Nunca (1999)

 El Paquetón
 La Marquesina
 El Jondia'o
 Sentencia
 La Picadora
 Quítate de Ahí
 No Te Voy a Llorar
 Cómo Olvidar
 Hechicera
 Mi Merengue
 El Picotea'o
 El Zumbador

 Yo Quiero Alegría (2000)

 A Comer Lechón
 Toma Tu Yuca
 Ojos Azules
 Yo Quiero Alegría
 El Paquetón
 Los Pelos de Punta
 Devuélveme la Vida
 Polla Porque No Pone
 Qué Lindo Es Eso
 Me Muero Por Ella
 Wilfredo González
 Corazón Herido

 ¡Qué Vaina! (2002)

 La Cuerdecita
 Vivir Sin Tu Amor
 La Escoba
 La Maleta
 Las Flores
 El Orinoco
 Está Peleao
 Devuélveme la Vida
 Amapola
 Mi Amor
 Aunque Siga Viviendo
 El Polvo
 La Mujer Que Yo Quiero
 Qué Vaina

 El Paquetón (2003)

Compilations 

 15 Éxitos (1985)
 20 Grandes Éxitos (1994)

 El Hombre Tuyo Soy Yo
 El Tornillo
 India de los Ojos Verdes
 Consagración de Cariño
 Cuando Te Enamoro a Ti
 Divina Que Linda Eres
 Piedras En Mi Camino
 La Carta
 Cuando Me Enamoro de Ti
 Mi Suegra
 Río Rebelde
 El Tanque de Guerra
 El Alicate
 Ay Mamá
 Francisco No Llora
 La Cosquillita
 Que Cosita
 Dentro de Mi Corazón
 Amor Bonito
 Me Quiero Casar

References 

Year of birth missing (living people)
Living people
Merengue musicians
Dominican Republic musicians
21st-century accordionists